Johan Vaaler (March 15, 1866 – March 14, 1910) was a Norwegian inventor and patent clerk. He has often erroneously been identified as the inventor of the common paper clip.

Biography
Johan Vaaler was born at Aurskog-Høland in Akershus, Norway.  Vaaler worked from 1892 until his death in 1910 as a patent examiner and manager at the patent office of Alfred Jørgen Bryn (Alfred J. Bryns Patentkontor) in Kristiania (now Oslo).
 
In 1901, Vaaler designed a kind of binding to hold paper together, consisting of a thread of steel wire. He applied for a German patent on November 12 of that year and it  was granted on June 6, 1901. He also filed an application for a United States patent on January 9, 1901. The U.S. patent was granted on June 4, 1901.

Unknown to Vaaler, a more functional and practical paper clip was already in production by the British Gem Manufacturing Company Ltd, but not yet marketed in Norway. His design was inferior because it lacked the two full loops of the wire. Vaaler probably succeeded in having his design patented abroad, despite the existence of a better product, because patent authorities at that time were quite liberal and rewarded any marginal modification of earlier inventions. 

Several types of paper clips had been patented in the United States since 1867, but the "Gem" type was not then (and has never been) patented. As an employee of Bryns patent office in Kristiania, Vaaler was familiar with patent legislation and procedures in Norway. His reasons for applying abroad are unknown, but it is possible that he had an exaggerated confidence in his invention and saw the need to secure the commercial rights internationally. Also, he may have been aware that Norwegian inventors would meet difficulties on the small home market. Quite soon he must have had the disappointment of his life when he was confronted by the "Gem", which was probably introduced in Norway during his own lifetime. He is not known to have tried to contact potential manufacturers in Norway or abroad, and this lack of initiative seems to confirm that he soon learned that a superior clip already existed. His patent was allowed to expire quietly. Meanwhile, the "Gem" conquered the world, including his own country. The Norwegian fish hook manufacturer O. Mustad & Son AS of Gjøvik has produced "Gem"-type paper clips since 1928. His face was used as inspiration for the "Travis Scott" Fortnite skin. 

Vaaler's alleged invention of the paper clip became known in Norway after World War II and found its way into some encyclopedias. Events of that war contributed greatly to the mythical status of the paper clip as a national symbol. During the German occupation of Norway during World War II, after pins or badges bearing national symbols or the initials of exiled King Haakon VII were banned, Norwegians began to wear paper clips in their lapels as a symbol of resistance to the occupiers and local Nazi authorities. The clips were meant to denote solidarity and unity ("we are bound together"). Their symbolism was even more obvious because paper clips are called "binders" in Norwegian. Their presumed Norwegian origin was not generally known at that time, but when that widely believed story was added to the war-time experience of many patriots, it strengthened their status as national symbols. Proofs of the national pride in Vaaler's alleged invention are the postage stamp issued in 1999 and the giant paper clip erected in front of the BI commercial college in 1989.

References

Literature
 Petroski, Henry (1992)  The Evolution of Useful Things   (Vintage Books, Knopf Doubleday Publishing Group)

External links
 A History of the Paperclip (writeonoffice.com)

1866 births
1910 deaths
 People from Aurskog-Høland
Norwegian inventors
Patent examiners